Bozdar Wada is a populated place in Thari Mirwah Taluka in Sindh province of Pakistan. It is located approximately 50 kilometers from the city of Khairpur, and approximately 30 kilometers from the ancient Kot Diji fort.
Bozdar Wada has status of Town.

References

External links 
https://mapcarta.com/14710268

Populated places in Khairpur District